Motol is a cadastral area of Prague, the capital of the Czech Republic. It is located in the second-tier municipality of Prague 5.

It is the location of Motol University Hospital, a large teaching hospital.

Districts of Prague